Pearson Trotman (born 29 November 1949) is a Barbadian sprinter. He competed in the men's 4 × 100 metres relay at the 1976 Summer Olympics.

References

1949 births
Living people
Athletes (track and field) at the 1976 Summer Olympics
Barbadian male sprinters
Olympic athletes of Barbados
Place of birth missing (living people)